Sohail Jaffar Ali (born 17 April 1967) is a Pakistani first-class cricketer who played for Karachi, Pakistan National Shipping Corporation and Pakistan International Airlines. In the 2000/01 domestic season he put on 326 not out for the 1st wicket with Ghulam Ali for PIA. It remains the highest opening partnership of all time in List A cricket.

External links

1967 births
Living people
Pakistani cricketers
Karachi cricketers
Pakistan National Shipping Corporation cricketers
Pakistan International Airlines cricketers
Cricketers from Karachi
Karachi Whites cricketers
Karachi Blues cricketers
Hyderabad (Pakistan) cricketers